Athanasios Papageorgiou may refer to:
 Thanasis Papageorgiou, Greek footballer
 Athanasios Papageorgiou (archaeologist), Cypriot archaeologist
 Athanasios Papageorgiou (sport shooter), Greek sports shooter